Jones-Brown-Smith (also released as Rockin' in Rhythm) is an album by pianist Hank Jones, bassist Ray Brown and drummer Jimmie Smith recorded in 1976 for the Concord Jazz label.

Reception

Allmusic awarded the album 3 stars, stating: "An unusual aspect to the music is that on half of the eight standards Jones switches to electric piano; although he does not display as strong a musical personality on that instrument, he plays quite well." The Penguin Guide to Jazz praised the renditions of "Bags' Groove" and "Spring Is Here", but criticized the selection of other material, and preferred other Jones albums from the same period.

Track listing
 "Your Feet's Too Big" (Ada Benson, Fred Fisher) - 5:42
 "Dancing on the Ceiling" (Lorenz Hart, Richard Rodgers) - 5:06
 "My Ship" (Ira Gershwin, Kurt Weill) - 5:46
 "Spring Is Here" (Hart, Rodgers) - 3:43
 "Rockin' in Rhythm" (Duke Ellington, Harry Carney,  Irving Mills) - 5:49
 "Bags' Groove" (Milt Jackson) - 4:22
 "Alone Together" (Howard Dietz, Arthur Schwartz) - 3:46
 "The Girl Next Door" (Ralph Blane, Hugh Martin) - 6:08

Personnel 
Hank Jones - piano, electric piano
Ray Brown - bass
Jimmie Smith - drums

References 

1977 albums
Hank Jones albums
Concord Records albums
Albums produced by Carl Jefferson